Ishida is a Japanese surname.

Ishida may also refer to:

Places
Ishida, Gifu, former village that existed for the year 1874 only, now part of Kakamigahara
Ishida, Nagasaki, former town merged with its neighbors to form the city of Iki in 2004
Ishida Station (disambiguation), several railway stations

Other
Ishida (company), manufacturer of packing line equipment
 Ishida (shogi), a type of opening in shogi